Lyle Benjamin Borst (24 November 1912 – 30 July 2002) was an American nuclear physicist and inventor. He worked with Enrico Fermi in Chicago, was involved with the Manhattan District Project, and worked with Ernest O. Wollan to conduct neutron scattering and neutron diffraction studies.

Life and Times
Lyle Benjamin Borst was born on 24 November 1912 in Cook County at Chicago, Illinois the son of George William Borst aged 39 of Chicago, Illinois and Jennie Beveridge aged 26. Borst was married to Ruth Barbara Mayer Borst for 63 years and had 3 children, sons, John Benjamin and Stephen Lyle and daughter, Frances Elizabeth Wright including 7 grandchildren and 4 great grandchildren. He died at his home in Williamsville, New York on 30 July 2002.

Career
Borst attended the University of Illinois at Urbana–Champaign and received bachelor's and master's degrees. He attended the University of Chicago and was awarded a doctorate degree in chemistry in 1941.
Borst worked as a senior physicist on the Manhattan Project from 1943 to 1946 at the Clinton Laboratories in Oak Ridge, Tennessee. In 1944 Ernest O. Wollan and Borst used neutron diffraction to produce "rocking curves" for crystals of gypsum and sodium chloride (salt). In 1946 Karl Z. Morgan and Borst at Oak Ridge develop a film badge to measure worker exposure to fast neutrons. From 1946 to 1951 Borst was Chairman of the Department of Reactor Science and Engineering at Brookhaven National Laboratory and was responsible for the operation and oversight of the Brookhaven Graphite Research Reactor. He played a key role in the design of the research reactor. Borst was at the University of Utah from 1951 to 1953 as Professor of Physics. From 1956 to 1961 he was Chairman of the Department of Physics at the College of Engineering at New York University. From 1961 to 1983 Borst was Professor of Physics at State University of New York in Buffalo, New York and was appointed Professor Emeritus in 1983. In 1969 he served as Master of Clifford Furnas College at the State University of New York at Buffalo.

Professional Service
National Board of the American Civil Liberties Union, member
ACLU, Niagara Frontier Chapter, Chairman
American Physical Society, Fellow
American Association for the Advancement of Science, member
Association of Oak Ridge Scientists, founding member
Federation of Atomic Scientists, founder

Publications

Thesis and Dissertation
The Angular Distribution of Recoil Nuclei. 1941

Patents
Adjustable support for spectrometer reflectors. 18 December 1951.
Method of testing hermetic containers. 17 February 1959.
Central control system. 22 September 1959.
Neutronic reactor shielding. 11 July 1961.
Convergent Neutronic Reactor. 5 June 1962.
Neutron amplifier. 2 October 1962.
Process for cooling a nuclear reactor. 11 December 1962.
Improvements in neutron reactors. 1962.
Temperature measuring method and apparatus. 30 July 1963.
Nuclear reactor for a railway vehicle. 31 March 1964.
Neutron reactors. 20 July 1965.
Nuclear power reactor. 27 July 1965.
Process for controlling thermal neutron concentration in an irradiated system.  18 October 1966.
Neutron amplifier. 13 December 1966.
Photographic process. 29 June 1976.

References

1912 births
2002 deaths
American nuclear physicists
20th-century American inventors
Health physicists
Manhattan Project people
Oak Ridge National Laboratory people
Neutron scattering
Neutron instrumentation
American Civil Liberties Union people
Fellows of the American Physical Society
Brookhaven National Laboratory staff
Enrico Fermi
Polytechnic Institute of New York University faculty
State University of New York faculty
University of Utah faculty
University of Illinois Urbana-Champaign alumni
University of Chicago alumni
Scientists from Chicago
20th-century American physicists
20th-century American chemists